Liu Lizhe (born 28 September 1975) is a Chinese judoka. She competed in the women's half-middleweight event at the 1996 Summer Olympics, finishing in sixteenth place.

References

1975 births
Living people
Chinese female judoka
Olympic judoka of China
Judoka at the 1996 Summer Olympics
Place of birth missing (living people)
20th-century Chinese women
21st-century Chinese women